James Parke, 1st Baron Wensleydale PC (22 March 1782 – 25 February 1868) was a British barrister and judge. After an education at  The King's School, Macclesfield and Trinity College, Cambridge he studied under a special pleader, before being called to the Bar by the Inner Temple in 1813. Although not a particularly distinguished barrister, he was appointed to the Court of King's Bench on 28 November 1828, made a Privy Counsellor in 1833 and, a year later, a Baron of the Exchequer. He resigned his post in 1855, angered by the passing of the Common Law Procedure Acts, but was recalled by the government, who gave him a peerage as Baron Wensleydale of Walton to allow him to undertake the Judicial functions of the House of Lords, a role he fulfilled until his death on 25 February 1868.

Early life and education
Parke was born on 22 March 1782 in Highfield, near Liverpool, to Thomas Parke, a merchant, and his wife Anne. He studied at The King's School, Macclesfield before matriculating to Trinity College, Cambridge on 28 February 1799, where he won the Craven scholarship, Sir William Browne's gold medal, and was fifth wrangler and senior chancellor's medallist in classics. He gained a Bachelor of Arts in 1802 and a Master of Arts in 1804. Although admitted to Lincoln's Inn on 10 May 1803, he transferred to the Inner Temple on 22 April 1812, and after studying with a special pleader was called to the Bar in 1813.

Career
Parke's early career as a barrister was not noted as particularly brilliant, but he was successful; in 1820, for example, he was junior counsel for the Pains and Penalties Bill 1820 against Caroline of Brunswick. On 28 November 1828 he succeeded Sir George Holroyd as a judge of the Court of King's Bench, a great achievement for somebody who had not even qualified as a King's Counsel, and he was knighted on 1 December 1828. In 1833 he was made a Privy Councillor, and on 29 April 1834 was transferred, along with Edward Hall Alderson, to the Court of Exchequer, succeeding and being succeeded as a judge of the Court of King's Bench by John Williams.

His work in the Court of Exchequer has led to him being called "one of the greatest of English judges; had he comprehended the principles of equity as fully as he did the principles of the common law, he might fairly be called the greatest. His mental power, his ability to grasp difficult points, to disentangle complicated facts, and to state the law clearly, have seldom been surpassed. No judgments delivered during this period are of greater service to the student of law than his". He was criticised for being too respectful of authority and unwilling to overturn precedent; John Coleridge accused him of being dedicated to the form of the law rather than the substance.

The Common Law Procedure Acts 1854 and 1855 led to his resignation from the Exchequer in disgust, but his reputation was such that the government recalled him by granting him a life peerage, that of Baron Wensleydale, of Wensleydale, in the North Riding of Yorkshire on 16 January 1856. There was a question at the time of whether the letters patent, which granted him a peerage "for the term of his natural life", allowed him to sit in the House of Lords; it was eventually decided that they did not, and a second set was issued with the usual form for Baron Wensleydale, of Walton, in the County Palatine of Lancaster on 23 July 1856. This was irrelevant, since he had no sons able to take the peerage even if it was not a life appointment. He sat as part of the Appellate Committee of the House of Lords until his death on 25 February 1868.

Personal life
In 1817 he married Cecilia, the daughter of Samuel F. Barlow of Middlethorpe, Yorkshire. They had three children who survived childhood, all daughters:

Mary Parke (died 26 August 1843), an accomplished artist, married Charles Howard, a son of George Howard, 6th Earl of Carlisle, and was the mother of the painter and arts patron George Howard, 9th Earl of Carlisle.
Cecilia Anne Parke (died 20 April 1845), married Sir Matthew Ridley, 4th Baronet, and was the mother of Matthew Ridley, 5th Bnt (who was created Viscount Ridley and Baron Wensleydale in 1900).
Charlotte Alice Parke (died 5 January 1908), married William Lowther, a grandson of William Lowther, 1st Earl of Lonsdale.

Arms

References

Bibliography

|-

1782 births
1868 deaths
Alumni of Trinity College, Cambridge
Justices of the King's Bench
Barons of the Exchequer
Barons in the Peerage of the United Kingdom
Law lords
Lawyers from Liverpool
English legal writers
Life peers created by Queen Victoria
Members of the Privy Council of the United Kingdom
Members of the Judicial Committee of the Privy Council
19th-century English judges